South Crest School is a private primary and secondary educational institution in Muntinlupa in the Philippines. It is situated between two subdivisions, Agro Homes and Soldiers' Hills, thus giving it two addresses: 101 Canary St, Agro Homes Subdivision, Putatan, Muntinlupa and MBAI Commercial Complex, Soldiers Hills, Muntinlupa.

It was founded in 1983 as the Agro Homes Early Education Center (AHEEC) and since then has evolved into one of the leading schools in Muntinlupa. The students have been placed among the Ten Most Outstanding Students of Muntinlupa for the past 20 years, almost annually.

Beginnings
The late Major-General Santiago R. Madrid Jr., together with his family, settled at Soldiers' Hills Subdivision after his stint as commander in Cebu Island. When his fourth child, Judy, was already of schooling age, they began searching for a school they could entrust her in. To their dismay, not one was present in the vicinity of Soldiers' Hills and even in the adjacent Agro Homes.

Wanting to give their child the best education she could have, they considered starting a preschool. Mrs. Remedios Madrid, the general's wife, was particularly confident for she was a teacher herself. Thus, armed with municipal government's permission (Muntinlupa was still a municipality then) and sheer determination, they founded the Agro Homes Early Education Center in  1982. Mrs. Madrid invited some of her teacher friends to operate the fledgling learning center, teaching basic skills such as writing, speaking, mathematics and values. In the short span of two years, the school earned the respect and trust of parents within the area for its excellence in instructing children.

Expansion
In 1992, after requests from parents and pupils to expand the service of AHEEC to the community, the school administration established Elementary and Secondary Levels, registering itself under the name South Crest School. To meet the needs of the growing student population then, they expanded the school complex to the former cogonal area of Soldiers' Hills (whose remnants are still preserved today as a study area for students and as a site of observation for biology activities).

Code of Ethics
 I am a South Crestian who leads.
 I am a youth South Crestian who upholds to the best of my ability to the South Crestian law.
 I am a South Crestian who always bears the reputation of a good and law-abiding citizen.
 I am a South Crestian who preserves the high standards to which I have pledged myself.

Affiliations

 Aerospace Cadets of the Philippines (127th Squadron)
 Rotary Interact (under the supervision of the Rotary Club of Muntinlupa Business District)
 Alliance of Private School Administrators of Muntinlupa (APSAM)
 SCHOLASTIC Prime Mathematics

Awards Received 

Ten Most Outstanding Students of Muntinlupa Award (10MOST)

 Ronalynn Joy Cayobit (SY 1993-1994, 6th)
 Romelanie Macapinlac (SY 1994-1995, 7th)
 Lovella Inumerable (SY 1996-1997, 8th)
 Adem Joy Paras (1997-1998, 7th)
 Jay Patrick Santiago (SY 1999-2000, 1st)
 Carla Casimiro (SY 1999-2000, 7th)
 Melizza Anne Calupe (SY 2001-2002, 7th)
 Jasmine Egana (SY 2002-2003, 10th)
 Jana Patricia Lim (SY 2005-2006, 5th)  
 Hansley Juliano (SY 2006-2007, 2nd)
 Janine Marie Sanglap (SY 2011-2012, 10th)
 Chellie Allyza B. Madrid (10MOST2015, 8th)
 Gillian Francesca D. Trinidad (10MOST2016, 7th)
 Frances Robes (10MOST2018, New Dawn Youth Leadership Awardee)
 2001 - "Center of Mathematics" in the City of Muntinlupa cited by the Division Office of the Department of Education . The School offers specialized training, innovative programs and new instructional techniques in Mathematics.
 2000 - By the Rotary International District 3810 as one of the Rotary Interact Clubs with Excellent Community Projects in National Capital Region and Recipient of Ambassador of Goodwill to Japan and Outbound Youth Exchange Team to Singapore and Malaysia
 2019 - OVER-ALL CHAMPION, Aerospace Cadets of the Philippines NCR Competition
          的是什么

References 
Student Handbook, 2006, South Crest School.

External links 
Official FB Group of South Crest School

High schools in Metro Manila
Schools in Muntinlupa